"Fragile" is a 2016 song by Norwegian DJ and record producer Kygo and British singer Labrinth. It was released as the first promotional single from Kygo's debut studio album, Cloud Nine.

Charts

Release history

References

2016 singles
2016 songs
Kygo songs
Labrinth songs
Number-one singles in Norway
Song recordings produced by Kygo
Songs written by Kygo
Songs written by Labrinth
Sony Music singles